William Abbott (28 October 1856 – 22 December 1935) was an English first-class cricketer. Abbott's batting style is unknown, though it is known he fielded as a wicket-keeper. He was born at Walton-on-Thames, Surrey, and educated at Winchester College.

Abbott made his first-class debut for Surrey against Gloucestershire in 1877. He made two further first-class appearances for the county in that season against Middlesex and Yorkshire. He scored a total of 9 runs in his three matches, which came at an average of 1.80, with a high score of 5. Behind the stumps, he took 7 catches and made 2 stumpings.

He died at Woking, Surrey on 22 December 1935. His father, Charles, played a single first-class match for Surrey before the formation of the county cricket club.

References

External links
William Abbott at ESPNcricinfo
William Abbott at CricketArchive

1856 births
1935 deaths
People from Walton-on-Thames
People educated at Winchester College
English cricketers
Surrey cricketers
Wicket-keepers